Dimorphostylis echinata is a species of crustacean from the Diastylidae family. The scientific name of this species was first published in 1962 by Gamo.

References

Cumacea